Gonari (also Romanized as Gonārī) is a village in Byaban Rural District, Byaban District, Minab County, Hormozgan Province, Iran. At the 2006 census, its population was 259, in 41 families.

References 

Populated places in Minab County